Caesarea in Palestina may refer to:
the Roman city of Caesarea Maritima
the ancient and medieval diocese (and later titular see), see Caesarea in Palaestina (diocese)